Dimethyladenosine transferase 2; transcription factor B2, mitochondrial is an enzyme that in humans is encoded by the TFB2M gene.

This protein is a transcription initiation factor for the mitochondrial RNA polymerase, POLRMT. Its paralog TFB1M can perform a similar function, but only in vitro.

References

Further reading